Rividavia Department may refer to:
Rivadavia Department, Mendoza
Rivadavia Department, Salta
Rivadavia Department, San Juan
Rivadavia Department, Santiago